Northern Illinois University's Convocation Center is a 10,000-seat multi-purpose arena, at 1525 W Lincoln Hwy, in DeKalb, Illinois, USA. The arena opened in 2002 (20 years ago). The Convocation Center is home to both the Northern Illinois Huskies men's basketball and women's basketball teams, volleyball, Wrestling, gymnastics, and women's indoor track and field squads.  Previously, the basketball teams played at the Chick Evans Field House. The Convocation Center also houses many other events including the opening convocation ceremony for freshmen, concerts, job fairs, expositions, and the annual graduation ceremony.

The first Northern Illinois athletic event in the new facility happened on August 30, 2002, when the Huskies women's volleyball team defeated IUPUI, 3–1, in the opening round of the Best Western Invitational at Victor E. Court.

Entertainers that have performed at the center include Bob Dylan (from MN), Bill Cosby, Blue Man Group, Brooks & Dunn, Daughtry in 2012, Sheryl Crow (from MO) in 2013, Drake, Dave Chappelle, Sugarland, Goo Goo Dolls, 3 Doors Down, Carrie Underwood, Josh Turner, Chamillionaire, Chingy (from STL), Rascal Flatts (from OH), Michelle Branch, John Mayer, Wayne Brady, O.A.R., Hoobastank, Ludacris (from IL. In 2003.), Ashlee Simpson, Jason Aldean, REO Speedwagon (from Champaign), Ja Rule, Counting Crows, Bill Engvall, Jimmy Eat World with Paramore, B.B. King, 311 (from Omaha), Cheap Trick (from Rockford), Joan Jett, Cedric the Entertainer (from STL), Larry the Cable Guy (from NE), Nelly and St. Lunatics in 2005, Ciara, Dierks Bentley, Kanye West (from Oak Lawn, IL. In 2005.), Twista (from the Chi. In 2005.) Lupe Fiasco (from Chicago. In 2011.), Kid Cudi (from OH) in 2013, Incubus, Staind, Big & Rich, Three Days Grace Casting Crowns, Styx (from Chicago) with Kansas, Jars of Clay (from IL), Gretchen Wilson (from IL), Brett Eldredge (from IL), Garrison Keillor (from MN), Sesame Street Live, Young Jeezy, T.I., and T-Pain. Saliva with Trapt and other bands in 2016. Thomas Rhett with Kelsea Ballerini in 2017. The Daily Show host Trevor Noah in 2019, and Young the Giant in 2019.

The arena was also the site of a memorial service held on February 24, 2008 in tribute to the victims of the Northern Illinois University shooting. Bon Jovi was scheduled to rehearse at the arena beginning February 14, 2008, prior to the start of the North American leg of their Lost Highway Tour on February 18 in Omaha, but was forced to start the tour without rehearsals due to the NIU shooting and the subsequent closure of the campus.

A county-wide meeting of Jehovah's Witnesses takes place here yearly during the second weekend of August.

References

External links
Convocation Center Official Website
Convocation Center Recent Official Website

College basketball venues in the United States
Basketball venues in Illinois
Gymnastics venues in Illinois
Volleyball venues in Illinois
Wrestling venues in Illinois
Northern Illinois Huskies basketball venues
Buildings and structures in DeKalb County, Illinois
Northern Illinois University
2002 establishments in Illinois
Sports venues completed in 2002